Vadzim Likharad (born 6 September 1993) is a Belarusian weightlifter.

He participated at the 2018 World Weightlifting Championships, winning a medal. In 2020 he tested positive for a Dehydrochoromethyl-testosterone metabolite and is banned until 2024 by the International Weightlifting Federation.

References

External links

1993 births
Living people
Belarusian male weightlifters
World Weightlifting Championships medalists
European Weightlifting Championships medalists
21st-century Belarusian people